Paula Badosa was the defending champion, but chose not to participate.

Varvara Gracheva won the title, defeating Tamara Korpatsch in the final, 3–6, 6–2, 6–0.

Seeds

Draw

Finals

Top half

Bottom half

References

Main Draw

BBVA Open Ciudad de Valencia - Singles